Mollivirus sibericum is a giant virus discovered in 2015 by French researchers Chantal Abergel and Jean-Michel Claverie in a 30,000-year-old sample of Siberian permafrost, where the team had previously found the unrelated giant virus Pithovirus sibericum. Mollivirus sibericum is a spherical DNA virus with a diameter of 500–600 nanometers (0.5–0.6 μm).

Mollivirus sibericum is the fourth ancient virus that scientists have found frozen in permafrost since 2003.

Description

Mollivirus sibericum is an approximately spherical virion 0.6 μm in diameter. It encloses a 651 kb GC-rich genome encoding 523 proteins, of which 64% are ORFs. The host's ribosomal proteins are packaged in the virion.

See also

 Virus classification
 Introduction to viruses
 List of viruses

References

Nucleocytoplasmic large DNA viruses
Taxa described in 2015